M. Muthukrishnan was an Indian politician and former Member of Parliament elected from Tamil Nadu. He was elected to the Lok Sabha from Vellore constituency as an Indian National Congress candidate in 1951 and 1957 elections.

References 

Indian National Congress politicians from Tamil Nadu
Living people
India MPs 1952–1957
India MPs 1957–1962
Lok Sabha members from Tamil Nadu
People from Vellore
Year of birth missing (living people)